Gandabeh (also Romanized as Gandābeh and Gandāveh; also known as Gandābeh Ḩoseynābād and Hoseynābād) is a village in Azna Rural District, in the Central District of Khorramabad County, Lorestan Province, Iran. At the 2006 census, its population was 56, in 12 families.

References 

Towns and villages in Khorramabad County